Jacqueline Fernandez (born 11 August 1985) is a Sri Lankan actress and model. She has worked in Indian films, predominantly in Hindi, besides appearing in reality shows and music videos. Debuting with Aladin in 2009, she has since then established a career in the Hindi film industry. Fernandez was born and raised in Bahrain to a multiracial Eurasian family of Sri Lankan, Canadian, and Malaysian descent. After graduating in mass communication from the University of Sydney and working as a television reporter in Sri Lanka, she joined the modeling industry. She was crowned Miss Universe Sri Lanka in 2006, and represented her country at Miss Universe 2006.

While on a modelling assignment in India in 2009, Fernandez successfully auditioned for Sujoy Ghosh's fantasy drama Aladin, which marked her acting debut. Fernandez had her breakthrough role with the psychological thriller Murder 2 (2011), her first commercial success. This was followed by glamorous roles in the commercially successful ensemble-comedy Housefull 2 (2012) and the action thriller Race 2 (2013), which garnered her an IIFA Award for Best Supporting Actress nomination. Fernandez went on to star in the top-grossing action films Kick (2014) and Vikrant Rona (2022), and the comedies Housefull 3 (2016) and Judwaa 2 (2017).

Alongside her screen acting career, Fernandez has worked as a judge in the ninth season of the dance reality show Jhalak Dikhhla Jaa (2016–2017), is a popular celebrity endorser for various brands and products, has participated in stage shows, and is active in humanitarian work.

Early life and modeling career 
Jacqueline Fernandez was born on 11 August 1985, in Manama, Bahrain, and was raised in a multi-ethnic family. Her father, Elroy Fernandez, is a Sri Lankan Burgher, and her mother, Kim, is of Malaysian and Canadian descent. Her maternal grandfather is Canadian and her great-grandparents were from Goa in India. Her father, who was a musician in Sri Lanka, moved to Bahrain in the 1980s to escape civil unrest between the Sinhalese and Tamils and subsequently met her mother, who was an air hostess. She is the youngest of four children with one elder sister and two elder brothers. After receiving her early education in Bahrain at Sacred Heart School, she studied mass communication at the University of Sydney in Australia. After graduating she did a couple of television shows in Sri Lanka. She also attended the Berlitz school of languages, where she learned Spanish and improved her French and Arabic.

According to Fernandez, she had aspired to become an actress at a young age and fantasized about becoming a Hollywood movie star. She received some training at the John School of Acting. Although, she was a television reporter, she accepted offers in the modeling industry, which came as a result of her pageant success. In 2006, she was crowned the winner of the Miss Universe Sri Lanka pageant and represented Sri Lanka at the world Miss Universe 2006 pageant held in Los Angeles. In a 2015 interview, Fernandez described the modeling industry as "a good training ground" and said: "It is a medium that is about shedding your inhibitions, knowing your body, confidence". In 2006, she appeared in a music video for the song "O Sathi" by music duo Bathiya and Santhush and young female singer Umaria Sinhawansa.

Acting career

2009–2013: Debut and breakthrough 
In 2009, Fernandez traveled to India for a modeling assignment. She successfully auditioned for Sujoy Ghosh's fantasy film Aladin (2009) her acting debut. She played the love interest of Riteish Deshmukh's character, a role based on the character of Princess Jasmine. and Rajeev Masand of CNN-IBN felt that she was: "easy on the eyes and appears confident but has precious little to do". Although the film was a critical and commercial failure, she won the IIFA Award for Star Debut of the Year – Female.

In 2010, Fernandez appeared opposite Deshmukh in the science fiction romantic comedy Jaane Kahan Se Aayi Hai. She was cast as a girl from Venus, who lands on Earth in search of love. The film, along with Fernandez's performance, received poor reviews; Rediff.com's Sukanya Verma noted: "She gamely makes a fool of herself whilst aping the actions of movie stars, ranging from Sridevi's Naagin dance, Mithun Chakravarthy's Disco Dancer moves, to Big B's violent headshake in Hum. Her Tara could be a keeper if only Jaane Kahan Se Aayi Hai wasn't so intent on turning her into a love-struck Barbie." Critic Anupama Chopra also criticized Fernandez, calling her "a pin-prick on a balloon". Later that year, she made a special appearance in the song "Dhanno" for Sajid Khan's comedy Housefull.

Mahesh Bhatt's thriller Murder 2 was Fernandez's first commercial success and marked a turning point in her career. She took on the role of Priya, a lonely model who is in a confused relationship with Arjun Bhagwat (played by Emraan Hashmi). Fernandez was praised for her performance, and for the boldness and sex appeal she displayed in the film. Gaurav Malini of The Times of India stated that she was "tastefully tempting" but noted that her romance with Hashmi was "literally half-baked". The following year, Fernandez appeared in the ensemble comedy Housefull 2 alongside Akshay Kumar, John Abraham, and Asin. It became one of the top grossing productions of India that year and earned  worldwide. Fernandez received mostly negative reviews for her performance. While Gaurav Malini praised her for her looks, NDTV called her a "blathering bimbo" who "find[s] no pleasure in [her role]".  Despite the negative reviews, Fernandez received a Best Supporting Actress nomination at the 14th IIFA Awards for her performance.

Fernandez's first release of 2013 was Race 2, an ensemble action thriller (alongside Saif Ali Khan, John Abraham and Deepika Padukone), described as the "cinematic equivalent of a trashy novel" by critic Rajeev Masand. She played Omisha, a femme fatale, a role which required her learn fencing and some acrobatics. In a particularly scathing review, Saibal Chatterjee of NDTV wrote that both Fernandez and Padukone "strut around like wound-up automatons that are all decked-up but have nowhere to go." Also that year, Fernandez appeared in an item number, titled, "Jaadu Ki Jhappi", for Prabhu Deva's romantic comedy Ramaiya Vastavaiya.

2014–present: Commercial success 
In 2014, Fernandez appeared in Sajid Nadiadwala's directorial debut—the action film Kick, a remake of a 2009 Telugu film of same name. She starred opposite Salman Khan, playing Shaina, a psychiatrist. She retained her real voice for the first time in Kick. While Sneha May Francis commented that she is: "incredibly dazzling, and moves like a magic", Raja Sen of Rediff.com was more critical of her dialogue delivery, calling it "unfortunate." The film established Fernandez as one of the most popular Bollywood actresses.

In 2015, Fernandez featured in Vicky Singh's Roy, a romantic thriller, which critic Sarita A. Tanwar described as a "boring, exhausting and pretentious" film. Fernandez played dual roles, Ayesha Aamir, a filmmaker in a relationship with another filmmaker (played by Arjun Rampal) and Tia Desai, a girl in love with a thief (played by Ranbir Kapoor). While India TV called it "her best act till date", critic Rajeev Masand felt that she "appears miscast in a part that required greater range." Roy failed to meet its box-office expectations, and was a commercial failure. Later that year, she appeared in a guest appearance for the comedy-satire Bangistan.

Karan Malhotra's action drama Brothers was Fernandez's next release. Co-starring alongside Akshay Kumar and Sidharth Malhotra, Fernandez played Jenny, a fearless mother struggling for her child, a role which she described as "challenging", "intense", and "difficult". The role marked a departure from the glamorous characters that she had a reputation for portraying. Dhriti Sharma of Zee News called her character "soft, timid and promising", and praised her for: "convincingly pull[ing] off a pleasing character of a street fighter's wife". Film critic Subhash K. Jha noted that she: "...in a limited role gives her finest emotive shot", while critic Raja Sen remarked: "[she] plays Kumar's long-sobbing wife who gets so deliriously happy on seeing a text message that it may well have contained news about a Kick sequel." Later that year, she starred in the horror thriller Definition of Fear, which marked her Hollywood debut.

Fernandez began 2016 with a role in Housefull 3 which is the third installment to the Housefull Series's. The ensemble comedy film paired her with Akshay Kumar as her love interest. The critic for Firstpost was disappointed with the picture and criticized Fernandez for her inclination towards a film, where she is treated as nothing more than a "visual attraction". Nevertheless, the film was a commercial success, grossing  worldwide. Her next film—the action adventure Dishoom—also grossed   worldwide at the box-office. Later that year, she served as a judge to the ninth season of the dance show Jhalak Dikhhla Jaa.

In 2017, Fernandez appeared in Chandran Rutnam's English-Sri Lankan crime-thriller According to Matthew. The film was her maiden cinematic appearance in Sri Lankan cinema as well. The film was released in Sri Lanka on 7 April 2017 in CEL Theatres with the title Anuragini. Her next film was the action-comedy A Gentleman, with Siddharth Malhotra from the director duo Raj Nidimoru and Krishna D.K. The film was poorly received by critics and was a box-office flop. Later that year, she appeared in David Dhawan's comedy film Judwaa 2, opposite Varun Dhawan and Taapsee Pannu. It was a sequel to the 1997 comedy film Judwaa. The film proved to be a box-office success earning   worldwide. In 2018, she starred alongside Salman Khan in Race 3, the third addition to the Race Franchise. Race 3 was a box office success earning more than   worldwide despite mixed reviews.

Fernandez is filming Tarun Mansukhani's next, Drive opposite Sushant Singh Rajput. She is set to star in the Netflix original film, Mrs. Serial Killer, directed by Shirish Kunder. She is also set to feature with Akshay Kumar for the fourth time in a gangster drama Bachchhan Paandey.

Personal life and other work 

Fernandez shares a close bond with her family, and admits that she misses being around them. She says: "I miss them so much everyday. You don't realise when you live away from home how difficult life can be [...] At the same time, staying away from them has taught me to be more responsible. It has taught me so many things about myself, about priorities and time management."

In 2008, Fernandez started dating Bahraini prince Hassan bin Rashid Al Khalifa, whom she met at a mutual friend's party; they separated in 2011. While filming Housefull 2 in 2011, Fernandez began a romantic relationship with director Sajid Khan. The relationship attracted media coverage in India and there was speculation of an impending wedding. However, the relationship ended in May 2013.

Fernandez has supported charitable organisations and a number of causes. For advocating the welfare of animals, Fernandez was named "Woman Of The Year" by PETA (India) in 2014. Fernandez is a vegan.

Fernandez has participated in several concert tours and televised award ceremonies. In 2013, she performed at the Temptations Reloaded in Auckland, Perth, and Sydney alongside Shah Rukh Khan, Rani Mukerji, and Madhuri Dixit. She also performed at the live talent show "Got Talent World Stage Live" with Khan, Priyanka Chopra and Varun Dhawan the following year. In July 2014, Fernandez opened a restaurant in Colombo, Kaema Sutra, in collaboration with chef Dharshan Munidasa, which specialises in contemporary Sri Lankan cuisine. In July 2018, Fernandez co-founded her activewear clothing line-up, Just F. In March 2022, Fernandez danced to instant hit "Arabic Kuthu" song alongside other actresses on a TV show.

In the media 

In 2008 and 2011, Fernandez featured in the UK magazine Eastern Eye "World's Sexiest Asian Women" list, ranking twelfth. She was ranked third on The Times of India listing of the "Most Desirable Woman" in 2013 and 2014, after being ranked eighth, seventh and fourteenth, respectively, in the preceding three years. In 2013, Rediff.com placed her on their list of "Bollywood's Best Dressed Actresses". The following year, she held the sixty second position in the Indian edition of the Forbes Celebrity 100, a list based on the income and popularity of India's celebrities.

In early 2013, Fernandez became the ambassador for HTC One, which she endorses in India. She was the face of Indian Bridal Fashion Week—IBFW of 2013.
Later that year, she became the spokesperson for Gareth Pugh's designed Forevermark Diamonds in Mumbai, and was at the inaugural opening of the Forever 21 store in Mumbai.
That year, she also launched Gillette Shaving System with Arbaaz Khan and Aditya Roy Kapur. While analysing Fernandez's career, India TV noted: "Slowly and steadily Jacqueline Fernandez is climbing up the ladder of success [...] Jacqueline is comfortably grasping every aspect of the work, which an actress is required to do and is accordingly giving results." On the contrary, Charu Thakur of India Today criticized her acting skills, but remarked that: "[she has] managed to find her feet in Bollywood now by banking on glamorous roles".

In 2017, Fernandez invested  in Rakyan Beverages' Raw Pressery. The company claim that with this investment, Fernandez became India's first celebrity to part-finance a consumer products firm.

Controversy 
Since December 2021, Fernandez has been subjected to an investigation into a money laundering case involving ₹200 crore. The investigation is being carried out by the Enforcement Directorate (ED) who questioned Fernandez for 10 hours in relation to the case on 9 December 2021. On 22 December, ED rejected Fernandez's request to downgrade the Lookout Circular (LOC) which was issued against her in the case which blocks her to travel outside India.

Fernandez was removed from the upcoming movie The Ghost which will star Nagarjuna. It is speculated that the eviction from the movie happened due to the money laundering case.

On 17 August 2022, The Enforcement Directorate named Jacqueline Fernandez as an accused in the same money-laundering case involving Sukesh Chandrashekhar. In response, she furnished said that FDs were made before having any links with the conman and all her income was legal and tax was also paid on it.

On 26 September 2022, At the request of Jacqueline's lawyer, the court granted interim bail to Jacqueline on a bail bond of ₹50,000.

Filmography

Films 

All films are in Hindi unless otherwise noted.

Television

Music videos

Awards and nominations 
Fernandez has won numerous awards mainly for her works in Housefull 2, its sequel Housefull 3, Murder 2, and Race 3.

References

Further reading

External links 

 
 
 

1985 births
Living people
People from Manama
Sri Lankan film actresses
Sri Lankan female models
Sri Lankan expatriates in Bahrain
Sri Lankan beauty pageant winners
Miss Universe 2006 contestants
Actresses in Hindi cinema
Actresses in Tamil cinema
Actresses in Telugu cinema
Actresses in Kannada cinema
Sri Lankan expatriates in India
Expatriate actresses in India
International Indian Film Academy Awards winners
Burgher models
Sri Lankan people of Malaysian descent
Sri Lankan people of Canadian descent
Sri Lankan people of Dutch descent
Sri Lankan Malays
Sri Lankan Roman Catholics
Sri Lankan expatriates in Australia
University of Sydney alumni
21st-century Sri Lankan actresses